David Euripedes Marques de Oliveira (born February 18, 1990 in Brasília), known as just David, is a Brazilian footballer who plays for Gama as midfielder. He already played for national competitions such as Copa do Brasil and Campeonato Brasileiro Série D.

Career statistics

References

External links

1990 births
Living people
Brazilian footballers
Association football midfielders
Brasiliense Futebol Clube players
Sociedade Esportiva do Gama players
Footballers from Brasília